Captain Harry Willes Darell de Windt  (9 April 1856, Paris - 30 November 1933, Bournemouth) was the aide-de-camp to his brother-in-law Charles Brooke, Rajah of Sarawak (Harry's sister Margaret was Brooke's wife), and is best known as an explorer and travel writer. His books were published under the name of Harry de Windt.

Harry de Windt was the son of Captain Joseph Clayton Jennyns de Windt, of Blunsdon Hall, Highworth. He was admitted to Magdalene College, Cambridge in 1875, but did not take a degree, travelling with his brother-in-law from 1876 to 1878. He was married several times, his first wife was Frances Laura Arabella Long, sister to the 1st Viscount Long of Wraxall, whom he married in London in 1882. They were divorced in 1888. There was one child from this union, a daughter, Margaret Maude.  Harry married (2ndly) Hilda Frances E Clark, daughter of the Rev Professor William Robinson Clark, in 1899.  She died in 1924.  In 1927 Harry married the actress Charlotte Elizabeth Ihle, better known by her stage name, Elaine Inescourt.

Works
 On the equator (1882)
 From Pekin to Calais by land (1889)
 A ride to India across Persia and Baluchistan (1891)
 Through the gold-fields of Alaska to Bering Straits (1898)
 
 From Paris to New York by land (1903), 1904 2nd printing

References

External links
 
 Harry de Windt biographical information.
 
 

1856 births
1933 deaths
Legion of Frontiersmen members
English travel writers
De Windt, Harry
Fellows of the Royal Geographical Society